The Borders of Poland are  or  long. The neighboring countries are Germany to the west, the Czech Republic and Slovakia to the south, Ukraine and Belarus to the east, and Lithuania and the Russian province of Kaliningrad Oblast to the northeast. To the north, Poland is bordered by the Baltic Sea.

Breakdown of border lengths per entity:
 Czech Republic–Poland border:  or 
 Poland–Slovakia border:  or 
 Poland–Ukraine border:  or 
 Germany–Poland border: 
 Belarus–Poland border:  or 
 Poland–Russia border (Kaliningrad Oblast): 
 Lithuania–Poland border:  or 
 sea (Baltic Sea):  or 

History
The borders of modern Poland were defined in the aftermath of the Second World War and the establishment of the People's Republic of Poland. They were agreed in the field of international law by the Yalta Agreement of February 11, 1945 and the Potsdam Agreement of August 2, 1945. These agreements generally defined the course of borders, without setting them out in detail. Their specification and then demarcation in the field had to be normalized in bilateral agreements between the states concerned.

Major border crossings
After accession of Poland to the European Union in 2004, border crossings with EU states (Germany, Czech Republic, Slovakia and Lithuania) were made redundant. Infrastructure remains in place, but its systematic use and the controls are no longer allowed by the Schengen agreement.

Former
with Germany
 Świnoujście
 Kołbaskowo
 Kostrzyn nad Odrą
 Świecko
 Gubin
 Olszyna
 Zgorzelec
with the Czech Republic
 Jakuszyce (district of Szklarska Poręba)
 Kudowa-Słone
 Chałupki
 Cieszyn
with Slovakia
 Chyżne
 Łysa Polana
 Jurgów
 Barwinek
with Lithuania
 Ogrodniki
 Budzisko

Historically, Poland also had borders (and border crossings) with former countries, or with countries that no longer share a common border with Poland:
 former countries: Czechoslovakia, Soviet Union, East Germany
 countries which once shared a common border with Poland: Romania, Hungary, Latvia

Current
with Ukraine
 Korczowa

with Belarus
 Grodno
 
with Russia
 Grzechotki

See also

 Border Guard (Poland)
 Curzon Line
 Extreme points of Poland
 Geography of Poland
 Kaliningrad question
 Polish rail border crossings
 Territorial changes of Poland
 Poland–Belarus barrier

References